Spui or SPUI may refer to:
Spui (Amsterdam), a square in the centre of Amsterdam, Netherlands
Spui (river), in the Netherlands
Spui, Zeeland, a town in the Netherlands
Single-point urban interchange, a type of highway interchange